Melvin Brown  is an American music manager and  President/CEO of Melvin Brown Music Group (MBMG). Brown also operates partnerships as CO-Founder/CO-CEO of  Konvict Muzik  along with superstar singer Akon. In addition, Brown serves as co-owner of S&B Creative.

Career

2000–2002
Melvin Brown began his career in media after graduating from Duke University and moving to Orlando, Florida to work as an assistant to his first cousin and power music manager Johnny Wright.  It was there he "learned the ropes" of the industry by working on projects for international superstars like the Backstreet Boys, *NSYNC, Boys II Men, Britney Spears, and more.
In 2002, while working for Wright, Brown discovered the then unknown recording artist Akon.

2003–2009
In 2003, Akon and Brown founded Konvict Muzik. Since Konvict Muzik began operations they have been responsible for launching the careers of acts like T-Pain, and Lady Gaga.

2011–2015
In 2011, Brown formed a media company that would control and operate a wide variety of media based projects: the Melvin Brown Media Group|MBMG.

References

 Complex, "Executive Profiles", Complex  Magazine, 2014
 "JQT to advance into US Market", AllKpop, 2015
 "Executive Profiles", WizardsInkWorld, 2015
 "Cassanova Eyes Konvict", NewsTime, 2011
 "Executive Profiles", Prezi, 2014
 "Melvin Brown visits Siwon de super junior en el set de poisedon", Konda Korea, 2011
 "Melvin Brown visits Siwon", Suju, 2015
 "Konvict Muzik", OvGuide, 2014
 l"black wall street ", bmorenews, 2014

External links
 

1977 births
Living people
People from Aliquippa, Pennsylvania